Sven "X-et" Leonard Erixson (23 November 1899 - 17 May 1970) was a Swedish painter and sculptor. Son of Alfred and Mathilda Eriksson, he was married to Ingeborg Erixson with whom he had two children: a son, the artist Sverre Erixson (born 1932) and a daughter, the actor Irma Erixson (born 1937).

Early life
Erixson's journey to becoming an established artist was a long one. He started his apprenticeship to a master painter at age of 14. He continued his artistic education by studying decorative painting, while he took a position as a teacher of drawing at the Konstfack. This was followed by a year of study at the Royal Swedish Academy of Arts, to which he later returned as a Professor of painting 1943–53.

Career
Erixson has an extensive and diverse artistic production. He has painted landscapes with figures, often with motifs from the south, city and port pictures, interiors, floral pieces. He drew inspiration from a variety of sources, ranging from Medieval Folk art to German Expressionism. He spent a significant time throughout his artistic life to travel. Which both has been the source of various motives, mostly from Spain and the south of France, but during his travels he was always keen on study both old masters and the biggest contemporary artists of his time. Goya and Velazquez at Museo del Prado; El Greco in Toledo; Paul Klee, Lovis Corinth, Gustav Klimt and Egon Schiele at the Bavarian National Museum.

Erixson belong to Sweden's great modern painters, and his work is represented in most Swedish art museums. He was one of the artists who in 1932 started the artist-led gallery 'Color and shape' (Färg och Form).
His many artistic missions include frescos of Holy Cross Chapel at Woodland Cemetery in Stockholm (1938 to 1940), as well as his great fresco in the town hall of Huddinge (1948 to 1949), into which he wove his own childhood memories of the railroad town. Alongside his easel painting, Erixson often tried other artistic tasks, often involving his decorative imagination. For example, he created the theatrical decor of Garcia Lorca's Blood Wedding, 1944, decor and costume sketches to Aniara, 1959.

Swedish artists
1899 births
1970 deaths